Unjung-dong (운중동, 雲中洞) is one of the 19 dongs of Bundang-gu, in the city of Seongnam, Gyeonggi Province in South Korea.

External links
 Unjung-dong Office

Bundang
Neighbourhoods in South Korea